The 1997–98 Fairleigh Dickinson Knights men's basketball team represented Fairleigh Dickinson University during the 1997–98 NCAA Division I men's basketball season. The team was led by 15th-year head coach Tom Green. The Knights played their home games at the FDU Gym in Hackensack, New Jersey as members of the Northeast Conference.

The Knights compiled a 23–7 record and went 13–3 in ECAC Metro play to finish second in the conference regular season standings. They defeated Robert Morris, Wagner, and Long Island University to capture the NEC tournament championship. The Knights received the conference's automatic bid to the NCAA tournament as No. 15 seed in the East region. The Knights put up a fight  led by senior Elijah Allen's 43-point effort  but fell to No. 2 seed Connecticut, 93–85, in the opening round.

Roster

Schedule and results

|- 
!colspan=9 style=| Regular season

|-
!colspan=9 style=| NEC tournament

|-
!colspan=9 style=| NCAA tournament

References

Fairleigh Dickinson Knights men's basketball seasons
Fairleigh Dickinson
Fairleigh Dickinson
Fairleigh Dickinson
Fairleigh Dickinson